Vikrant baliyan is an Indian sanda fighter. He earned bronze medal in men's Sanda 60 kg at the 2019 World Wushu Championships in Shanghai, China, and gold medal in men's Sanda 60 kg at the 2019 South Asian Games in Pokhra, Nepal. Won Gold Medal in 9th Junior Asian Wushu Championship held from 14th September to 21st September 2017

India's Minister of Youth Affairs and Sports Kiren Rijiju Wushu World Championships medal winners World Wushu Championship 2019 in Shanghai. Vikrant Baliyan was also included.

See also 
 2019 World Wushu Championships

References

Indian sanshou practitioners
Indian male martial artists
Indian male boxers
Living people
World Games gold medalists
Indian martial arts
Wushu practitioners
Year of birth missing (living people)
Date of birth missing (living people)
Wushu practitioners in India
Indian wushu practitioners